Simmering  is a station on  of the Vienna U-Bahn. Above the U-Bahn station is the Wien Simmering railway station, which is served by international and regional trains, and also by line S80 of the Vienna S-Bahn.

Both stations are located in the Simmering District. The U-Bahn station opened in 2000.

References

Buildings and structures in Simmering (Vienna)
Railway stations opened in 2000
Vienna U-Bahn stations

de:U-Bahn-Station Simmering